Hasan Ülker (born 23 June 1995) is a Turkish-German footballer who plays as a midfielder for Turkish club Karagümrük.

References

External links
 
 

Turkish footballers
German footballers
Association football midfielders
TSG Sprockhövel players
FC Hansa Rostock players
3. Liga players
Sportspeople from Wuppertal
1995 births
Living people
Footballers from North Rhine-Westphalia